Antoine Lavalette (Martrin, 26 October 1708 – Toulouse, 13 December 1767), was a French Jesuit clergyman, Superior of the Martinique missions, whose bankruptcy led to the downfall of his order.

He became a member of the Society of Jesus in Toulouse, 10 October 1725, was ordained priest in 1740. He volunteered for the mission of the Lesser Antilles of the Paris Province, and in 1751 he was sent at the age of thirty-four to Martinique. In 1754 he was named superior-general of all the Jesuit missions in the French possessions in Central and South America. Initially he was a successful plantation owner, trading in selling sugar, coffee and indigo, while remaining within the limits imposed on business by clerics set in canon law.

His mission was heavily in debt, and to restore it to financial prosperity he made extensive purchases of land in Dominica and engaged in various commercial ventures. Without informing his superiors, Lavalette borrowed heavily from Frères Lioncy et Gouffre when these proved unsuccessful, and wound up in serious financial straights when the British seized twelve of thirteen ships bound for Bordeaux with produce in 1755. The trading house in France went bankrupt due to his losses. His conduct was one of the causes that led to the suppression of the Society of Jesus in France and the downfall of his order.

When Lorenzo Ricci, the Jesuit general, was informed of this in 1757, he sent instructions to Lavalette to desist immediately. But Lavalette, in flagrant violation of Canon Law and his vow of obedience began to try and manipulate trading agreements with Dutch Merchants. Ricci sent three visitors to Martinique, all of whom met with mishaps that prevented them from arriving. At last, in the spring of 1762, the fourth visitor, Father de la Marche, reached the island, and organized a tribunal of the principal fathers of the mission, before whom Lavalette appeared.

Lavalette was condemned and suspended from all ecclesiastical functions until their report was laid before the general of the order in Rome. He signed a confession declaring that he alone was guilty, and after his confession he went to England, where he was notified of his expulsion from the society by the Jesuit general.

Lavalette gave information to his superiors by which it appeared his debts amounted to 2,400,000 livres. The French Jesuits were making an effort to settle with the creditors when the case was brought before the courts, the whole Society was held responsible for the debt, and a decree was issued for the seizure of all their property. This rendered the Society in France bankrupt, and led to the royal edict of November, 1764, which abolished the order in that country.

one work 
 Lettres sur les Opérations du P. de Lavalette, Jésuite, et Supérieur Général des Missions des Isles Françoises du vent de l'Amérique, nécessaires aux négocians,

Notes

References
 James Grant Wilson, John Fiske, Appletons' cyclopaedia of American biography, Volume 3, New York, D. Appleton & company, 1887, p. 634.
 D. G. Thompson, ″The Lavalette affair and the Jesuit superiors″, French history 10 (1996): 206-239.
 Andrew Dial, “Antoine Lavalette, Slave Murderer: A Forgotten Scandal of the French West Indies”, Journal of Jesuit Studies 8, no. 1 (2020): 37–55. https://doi.org/10.1163/22141332-0801p003.

1708 births
1767 deaths
18th-century French Jesuits